Eduard Wickli (born 23 January 1949) is a Swiss handball player. He competed in the men's tournament at the 1980 Summer Olympics.

References

1949 births
Living people
Swiss male handball players
Olympic handball players of Switzerland
Handball players at the 1980 Summer Olympics
Place of birth missing (living people)